Vincent Abenojar De Jesus (born June 10, 1968) is a Filipino composer, librettist, musical scorer, and musical director for theater, television, and film. He is also a writer, lyricist, actor, singer, and educator.  He attended the University of the Philippines Diliman College of Music, and majored in piano and voice. He was a member of the Philippine Educational Theater Association from 1983 to 2020.

Career
He is a composer, writer, musical director, film music composer, and actor.

He is a two-time recipient of the Don Carlos Palanca Memorial Award for Literature.

He wrote the music and libretto of critically acclaimed hit musicals: 
 Care Divas 
 Changing Partners
 Himala: Isang Musikal
 Kung Paano Ako Naging Leading Lady
 Si Juan Tamad, Ang Diablo, at Ang Limang Milyong Boto
 Skin Deep
 Zsazsa Zaturnnah Ze Muzikal
Zsazsa Zaturnnah Ze Muveeh (2006 film version of Zsa Zsa Zaturnnah Ze Muzikal)

He has been awarded: 
 seven Philippine Movie Press Club Star Awards
 four Entertainment Press - Golden Screen Awards
 three Manunuri ng Pelikulang Pilipino - Gawad Urian
 two Film Academy of the Philippines - Luna Award
 one FAMAS Award
 one Cinema One Originals Award
 one GEMS Award
 one Gawad Tanglaw for Best Achievement in Film Music

He won: 
 two Philstage Gawad Buhay Awards for Outstanding Original Libretto (Skin Deep 2008 and Si Juan Tamad, Ang Diablo, at ang Limang Milyong Boto 2009)
 one for Outstanding Musical Direction (Batang Rizal – 2008)
 one for Outstanding Original Composition (Si Juan Tamad, Ang Diablo at Ang Limang Milyong Boto 2009)
 two for Outstanding Musical (Skin Deep 2008 and Si Juan Tamad, Ang Diablo, at Ang Limang Milyong Boto 2009)

He has written and acted as Pipay in Euro-Asia and GMA Network's TV series Camera Café, which won the 2008 Asian TV Award for Best Comedy. He co-hosted GMA Network's Wipeout: Matira Ang Matibay with Paolo Contis. He played the role of the "Assistant Director" in Cinemalaya's Ekstra, starring Vilma Santos and portrayed John Lloyd Cruz's father in Star Cinema's The Trial.

De Jesus was the comedy headwriter for GMA Network's variety show All-Out Sundays when it premiered on January 5, 2020. He later becomes the arranger and the musical director for its comedy segments since 2021.

Awards

References

External links
 
 
 Vincent de Jesus – Film Academy of the Philippines
 Vincent on Jesus on Spotify

1968 births
Academic staff of Ateneo de Manila University
Filipino film score composers
Filipino songwriters
Filipino male stage actors
Living people
University of the Philippines Diliman alumni
Filipino screenwriters
Filipino dramatists and playwrights
GMA Network (company) people